The Great Dome of Mehrabad, Brick-made Dome of Shad Mehrak or Brick-made Dome of Mehr Abad (Persian:گنبد آجری مهرآباد) is a historical building built during the Ilkhanid period of Persia. This building is located in Shad Mehrak, a village located in the south of the city of Nishapur in Razavi Khorasan Province of Iran. This building has been registered on Iran's national heritage list with the registration number of 1549. Another smaller building with similar building with a dome is also situated next to it.

Gallery

References 

Nishapur
Nishapur Quarter
Khorasan
Ilkhanate